During the 1977–78 season Hibernian, a football club based in Edinburgh, came fourth out of 10 clubs in the Scottish Premier Division and reached the fourth round of the Scottish Cup.

Scottish Premier Division

Final League table

Scottish League Cup

Anglo-Scottish Cup

Scottish Cup

See also
List of Hibernian F.C. seasons

References

External links
Hibernian 1977/1978 results and fixtures, Soccerbase

Hibernian F.C. seasons
Hibernian